Mark Berry (born 18 April 1964), better known as Bez, is an English percussionist, dancer, DJ and media personality. He is best known as a member of the rock bands Happy Mondays and Black Grape.

Early life
Mark Berry was born on 18 April 1964 in Bolton, Lancashire, the son of parents from the Norris Green district of Liverpool. His father was a detective inspector. He grew up in Little Hulton and Walkden, before moving to live with his grandparents in Wigan at the age of 16.

Career

Bez is best known as the maraca player, dancer, and de facto mascot of rock band Happy Mondays, having been invited by lead singer Shaun Ryder shortly after the band was formed. He is chiefly remembered for his bizarre style of dancing and use of maracas. The band's second single, "Freaky Dancin'", was rumoured to be a tribute to Bez. However, Ryder stated that this was not the case in his autobiography Twistin' My Melon.

After the Happy Mondays broke up, Bez became a member of Ryder's next group Black Grape, but he left them in 1997. That year, he had a feature on the BBC Two television programme The Sunday Show called Science with Bez. When both men faced large tax bills, Bez and Ryder reformed the Happy Mondays in 1998, but it was short-lived. A book about his experiences in both bands, Freaky Dancin''', was published by Pan MacMillan in 1998. In the opening chapter, Bez detailed an incident during a Happy Mondays gig at Manchester's Haçienda nightclub in 1986. In the middle of the set, he fell off the stage and cut his forehead. In the book, he writes, "The doc tells me to take it easy and put my feet up. I thought, 'I'm not fucking havin' that.' I got some of [lead guitarist] Moose's acid, dripped it in the cut and ran back out with me shakers. Fuckin' raz!"

He appeared on Celebrity Big Brother in 2005, in order to pay off his outstanding tax bills, and was voted as the winner of the series. He used some of his winnings to improve the engine of his London black cab; the television show Pimp My Ride UK customised it to make it suit him. After the cab was "pimped", it had twenty speakers, eight amps, two DVD players, fifteen TV screens and a camera on the grille linked to one of the screens, the sign saying TAXI on the top was changed to PIMP, and it had purple paint on the outside.

The New Musical Express (NME) carried a series of articles about famous members of bands whose musical contribution to their bandmates' success was negligible. The newspaper used the name "Bez" as a generic label for Chas Smash of Madness, Andrew Ridgeley of Wham!, Andy Fletcher of Depeche Mode, Paul Morley of Art of Noise, Linda McCartney of Wings, and Paul Rutherford of Frankie Goes to Hollywood.

In 2006, Bez was promoting a compilation album titled Bez's Madchester Anthems: Sorted Tunes from Back in the Day. The Happy Mondays again reformed: the third incarnation of the group had Bez touring with them. On 2 July 2007, they released their first studio album in 15 years entitled Uncle Dysfunktional. On 4 September 2007, Bez went head-to-head with royal correspondent James Whitaker on ITV television programme Don't Call Me Stupid and beat him. Bez and James taught each other about their respective specialist subjects: the Manchester music scene and royal etiquette, and then they were quizzed on what they had learnt. This was followed by a general knowledge round. Despite not knowing that the Queen has two birthdays, Bez won. His prize, as selected by James, was a bottle of expensive red wine and a decanter so he didn't have to drink any "poor person's supermarket plonk".

Bez took part in Series 4 of Adrenaline Junkie (aired on 1 October 2008 on ITV2), the tasks involved taking on the world's biggest bungee down the front of the dam which featured in GoldenEye, building an ice hotel in the mountains, and undertook a jump from one cable car to another. On 29 January 2012, Ryder announced on the radio station XFM that the band would return with the original and definitive line-up of himself, his brother Paul Ryder on bass, Bez, Gary Whelan on drums, Rowetta as backing vocalist, Mark Day on guitar and Paul Davis on keyboards. They appeared on ITV's This Morning, and were interviewed by Phillip Schofield. The band announced in September 2012 that they were writing their first album with the original line-up in more than 20 years.

Bez was announced as the headliner on the DJ stage at upcoming festival Party in the Pines on 3 May 2014. In September 2018, he took part in a special episode of Bargain Hunt where he and Rowetta competed against Jarvis Cocker and Candida Doyle from Pulp. Bez and Rowetta won the episode by earning a profit of £8, but it was later discovered that Bez's girlfriend had bought two of their items. As it was against the rules of the programme for friends and family of the teams to buy items the teams were selling, Cocker and Doyle were made the winners and Bez had to hand over £8 from his own pocket.

Personal life
Berry lives in Urmston, Greater Manchester. He is a fan of Manchester United. He is a beekeeper and beer brewer in his spare time, and has lived on land-shares in Herefordshire and Wales. At some point, he lived next door to Ryder in Padfield, Derbyshire.

Bez was declared bankrupt in 2005 and 2008.

In August 2010, Bez was convicted of physically assaulting his ex-girlfriend Monica Ward, with whom he has a son, by throttling and threatening to kill her. He was sentenced to four weeks in prison after having first received a community service sentence but refusing to co-operate. He was arrested at London's Euston Station in November 2010 for breaching a restraining order granted to Ward following the assault, and escorted to appear before magistrates in Manchester. Bez also has two older sons. His marriage to Firouzeh Razavi took place on 3 September 2022.

In November 2014, Bez became a patron of homeless organisation Coffee4Craig. The organisation started in 2013 when married couple Risha and Hendrix Lancaster lost Risha's brother, Craig White, to a heroin overdose while sleeping rough. He is very active in his support, even inviting them to join him on the onstage bed in London during a Black Grape gig and frequently discussing the issue of homelessness.

Bez stood as a candidate for the Salford and Eccles constituency in the 2015 UK General Election. The incumbent Member of Parliament (MP), Hazel Blears, announced her intention to stand down at the election. Bez ran on a platform of "free energy, free food and free anything". He received 703 votes (1.6% of the total turnout) which placed him in sixth position in the constituency. The seat was won by the new Labour Party candidate, Rebecca Long-Bailey, who received 21,364 votes (49.4% of the total).

In January 2021, during the third lockdown of the COVID-19 pandemic, Bez began operating as an online fitness instructor producing content on YouTube under the title "Buzzin’ with Bez".

In popular culture
In the film 24 Hour Party People, Bez is played by Chris Coghill.

In the sitcom The Royle Family, Antony announces that he will be managing a band called "Exit", which will partly be inspired by Happy Mondays, with one of the members doing an imitation of Bez. 

In the comedy series Peep Show, Jeremy gets a mercy spot in a band called The Executioner's Bong as they tell him he can "get in on maracas". Jeremy protests, "I won't be Bez. I wanna be in there on merit!"

In Series 10, Episode 6 of Would I Lie To You?, Rhod Gilbert claimed to have been "exactly like the Bez but with a guitar" in a fictional band called "Muckspreader".

In August 2021 it was announced that Bez would be a competitor on BBC's Celebrity MasterChef and in October 2021 that he would be a competitor on the fourteenth series of Dancing on Ice'' in 2022.

See also
 List of dancers

References

Sources
BBC News – Bez Dances His Way To Win
Bez to run for Salford MP in the 2015 general election

External links

1964 births
Living people
English male dancers
English male comedians
English stand-up comedians
English people convicted of assault
Happy Mondays members
Black Grape members
Maracas players
Music in Salford
People educated at Worsley Wardley Grammar School
People from Bolton
Reality show winners
British political party founders
Leaders of political parties in the United Kingdom
English exercise instructors